Bumps & Bruises is the debut studio album by American rapper Ugly God. It was released on August 9, 2019. The album features guest appearances from Takeoff, Wintertime, and Lil Pump. The cover for the album was originally released on Instagram at the end of 2018.

Release and promotion
Ugly God first teased the album in January 2018, when he tweeted the album artwork. He continued to tease this album and two other projects on February 20, 2018, saying

Bumps & Bruises is the debut album. 777 is my EP that will either drop right before or right after my album. It's Gonna Be One Ugly Winter is a collab EP with @wintertime. All of these are dropping within the next few months. Release dates coming soon.

On April 24, 2018, Ugly God posted an EP to his SoundCloud titled Just a Lil Something Before the Album... which served as a teaser for the album.

On October 19, 2018, Ugly God posted a trailer for the album on his Instagram. On December 14, 2018, Ugly God confirmed that the album would contain of sixteen tracks.

On July 15, 2019, Ugly God announced that the album would officially be released on August 9, 2019, in addition to releasing another trailer. Two days later, he unveiled the track listing, revealing fourteen tracks with two featured artists.

On August 9, Ugly God released the album as a deluxe version, featuring two previously released singles, "Hello" (featuring Lil Pump) and "Lost in the Sauce". He promoted the album with an interview on the "Everyday Struggle" show, as well as having an Instagram Live with Wintertime (one of the features) moments before releasing the album. During initial promotion on the album, Ugly God implied rapper Lil Yachty would be featured, but this feature was not included on the album.

Producer Tay Keith assisted in production of the track "Batman". The track "Leave a Tip" was initially released in early 2018 with rapper Splash Drexler, it was re-released in the album without a feature.

Track listing
All tracks produced by Ugly God, except where noted.

Charts

References

External links
 Album at Genius.com

2019 debut albums
Ugly God albums
Asylum Records albums